Heinrich "Heini" Fischer (born 12 January 1950) is a Swiss rower who competed in the 1972 Summer Olympics.

In 1972 he and his partner Alfred Bachmann won the silver medal in the coxless pairs event.

References
 

1950 births
Living people
Swiss male rowers
Olympic rowers of Switzerland
Rowers at the 1972 Summer Olympics
Olympic silver medalists for Switzerland
Olympic medalists in rowing
Medalists at the 1972 Summer Olympics